Natela Dzalamidze and Veronika Kudermetova were the defending champions, but Dzalamidze chose not to participate. Kudermetova successfully defended her title, this time alongside Aryna Sabalenka, defeating Monique Adamczak and Naomi Broady 2–6, 7–6(7–5), [10–6] in the final.

Seeds

Draw

Draw

References
Main Draw

OEC Taipei WTA Challenger - Doubles
Taipei WTA Ladies Open